Estonia participated in the XI. Summer Paralympic Games in Sydney, Australia. Estonian team representatives were president of Estonian Paralympic Committee  Toomas Vilosius, Estonian Minister of Social Affairs Eiki Nestor, secretary member Are Eller and  coaches Õnne Pollisinski and Rein Põldme.

Estonia entered 10 athletes in the following sports:

Athletics: 2 females and 2 males
Sailing: 1 male
Shooting: 1 male
Swimming: 4 females

Medallists

Other athletes

Athletics
 Denis Sedelnikov
 Men's Javelin Throw F20 – Final: 41.44 (→ 4. place )
 Men's Shot Put F20 – Final: 11.23 (→ 5. place )
 Sergei Dikun 
 Men's 100 m T20 – Semifinal Heat 1: 6th 12,01 (→ did not advance, 17. place )
 Men's 400 m T20 – Semifinal Heat 1: 6th 55,21 (→ did not advance, 17. place )
 Men's Long Jump MH – Final: 6.03 (→ 7. place )
 Sirly Tiik
 Women's High Jump F20 – Final: 1.44 (→ )
 Women's Long Jump F42-46 – Final: 4.89 (→ 4. place )
 Women's Shot Put F20 – Final: 10.34 (→ )
 Women's Javelin F20 – Final: 39.77 WR (→ )
 Helena Silm
 Women's Long Jump F12 – Final: 4.41 (→ 8. place )
 Women's Pentathlon P13 – Final: 1840 points (→ 7. place )

Sailing 
 Priidik Mentaal
 Mixed Single Person 2.4mr – 94 points (→ 15. place )

Shooting
 Helmut Mänd
 Mixed Air Rifle Prone SH1 – Preliminary: 32nd 593 (→ 32.- 38. place )

Swimming 
 Janne Mugame 
 Women's 50 m Freestyle S14 – Heats: 6th 31,37; Final: 31,25 (→ 8. place )
 Women's 100 m Freestyle S14 – Heats: 8th 1.08,59; Final: 1.08,96 (→ 8. place )
 Women's 50 m Backstroke S14 – Heats: 2nd 34,26; Final: 34,02 (→ )
 Women's 50 m Butterfly S14 – Heats: 5th 33,79; Final: 33,78 (→ 7. place )
 Women's 200 m Medley SM14 – Heats: 9th 32.55,78 (→ did not advance, 9. place )
 Women's 50 m Breaststroke SB14 – Heats: 6th 40,04; Final: 40,14 (→ 6. place )
 Eela Kokk
 Women's 50 m Freestyle S14  – Heats: 11th 32,89 (→ did not advance, 11. place )
 Women's 100 m Freestyle S14 – Heats: 9th 1.12,41 (→ did not advance, 9. place )
 Women's 50 m Backstroke S14 – Heats: 11th 42,45 (→ did not advance, 11. place )
 Women's 50 m Butterfly S14 – Heats: 11th 35,78 (→ did not advance, 11. place )
 Annika Raide 
 Women's 50 m Freestyle S11 – Heats: 11th 39,46 (→ did not advance, 11. place )
 Women's 100 m Freestyle S11 – Heats: 12th 1.27,87 (→ did not advance, 12. place )
 Women's 400 m Freestyle S11 – Heats: 9th 6.38,67 (→ did not advance, 9. place )
 Women's 100 m Backstroke S11 – Heats: 6th 1.30,50 ; Final: 1.30,31 (→ 7. place )
 Marge Kõrkjas
 Women's 50 m Freestyle S12 – Heats: 2nd 30,21 ; Final: 29,42 ER (→ )
 Women's 100 m Freestyle S12 – Heats: 3rd 1.06,26 ; Final: 1.06,38 (→ 6. place )
 Women's 100 m Backstroke S12 – Final: 1.26,71 (→ 6. place )

See also
Estonia at the Paralympics
Estonia at the 2000 Summer Olympics

External links
International Paralympic Committee
 Estonian Paralympic Committee

2000
Summer Paralympics
Nations at the 2000 Summer Paralympics